is a railway station in Fujieda, Shizuoka Prefecture, Japan, operated by Central Japan Railway Company (JR Tōkai).

Lines
Fujieda Station is served by the Tōkaidō Main Line, and is located 200.3 kilometers from the starting point of the line at Tokyo Station.

Station layout
Fujieda Station has an island platform serving Track 2 and Track 3, and a side platform serving the seldom-used Track 1. The platforms are connected to the station building by an elevated station concourse. The station building has automated ticket machines, TOICA automated turnstiles and a staffed "Midori no Madoguchi" service counter.

Platforms

Adjacent stations

|-
!colspan=5|Central Japan Railway Company

History
Fujieda Station was opened on April 16, 1889 when the section of the Tōkaidō Main Line connecting Shizuoka with Hamamatsu was completed. The city of Fujieda did not exist at that time, and the station was located in Aoshima Village. On April 27, 1889, a senior official of the Imperial Household Ministry, Hida Hamagoro was killed while attempting to jump onto a departing express train from the platform of Fujieda Station. At the time, trains on the Tōkaidō Main Line had no toilets, and the accident led to their introduction on May 10 of the same year. Operations of the Shizuoka Railway were discontinued at Fujieda on October 1, 1970. Regularly scheduled freight service was discontinued in 1971.

Station numbering was introduced to the section of the Tōkaidō Line operated JR Central in March 2018; Fujieda Station was assigned station number CA22.

Passenger statistics
In fiscal 2017, the station was used by an average of 11,362 passengers daily (boarding passengers only).

Surrounding area
Fujieda City Hall

See also
 List of Railway Stations in Japan

References

Yoshikawa, Fumio. Tokaido-sen 130-nen no ayumi. Grand-Prix Publishing (2002) .

External links

  

Railway stations in Japan opened in 1889
Railway stations in Shizuoka Prefecture
Tōkaidō Main Line
Stations of Central Japan Railway Company
Fujieda, Shizuoka